The Arquivo Histórico Nacional is the national archive of Angola. As of 2016 a new archives building was under construction in Camama. The Arquivo Histórico Nacional originated in the Centro Nacional de Documentação e Investigação Histórica.

Directors 
 Rosa Cruz e Silva, circa 1997 
 Francisco Alexandre, deputy director, circa 2013 
 Alexandra Aparício, circa 2017

See also 
 Unesco Memory of the World Register – Africa
 National Library of Angola
 List of national archives

References

Bibliography

External links
 OCLC WorldCat. Arquivo Nacional de Angola

Angola
Angolan culture
Historiography of Angola
Luanda